Viktor Deryabkin (born 11 May 1954, stanitsa Arkhonskaya, Prigorodny District, North Ossetia–Alania) is a Russian political figure and a deputy of the 7th and 8th State Dumas. 

In 1983 when Deryabkin was appointed the Deputy Secretary of the Party Committee of the Volga-Don River Shipping Company. From 1988 to 1990, he worked as an instructor and the chief organizer of the Rostov Regional Party Committee. In 1997, he was appointed head of the administration of the Proletarsky District. In 2002, he became Deputy Head of the Administration of the Rostov Region.

In 2016, he was elected deputy of the 7th State Duma from the Volgodonsk constituency. In September 2021, he was re-elected for the 8th State Duma.

References

1954 births
Living people
United Russia politicians
21st-century Russian politicians
Eighth convocation members of the State Duma (Russian Federation)
Seventh convocation members of the State Duma (Russian Federation)